Karur division is a revenue division in the Karur district of Tamil Nadu, India.

References 
 

Karur district